Happiness Is in the Field (French: Le bonheur est dans le pré) is a French comedy directed by Étienne Chatiliez in 1995.

Plot 
Francis Bergeade, owner of a toilet seats and brushes factory in Dole, has just turned 65 and his life is a misery. Tax services are harassing him, his snobby wife Nicole despises him, and his daughter wants an expensive wedding. Francis knows only moments of relief while lunching and dining in fancy restaurants with his best friend, car dealer Gérard. Stress becomes overwhelming and he suffers an attack from a blocked nerve.

During his convalescence, his family watch a reality television show about long-lost relationships and disappearances called Où es-tu? (Where are you?) featuring Spanish-born Dolorès Thivart and her daughters "Zig" and "Puce", producers of foie gras from Condom, who seek their husband and father, Michel, who vanished 27 years ago. Michel Thivart happens to be Francis's exact lookalike…

Cast

 Michel Serrault as Francis Bergeade 
 Eddy Mitchell as Gérard Thulliez
 Sabine Azéma as Nicole Bergeade 
 Carmen Maura as Dolores Thivart 
 François Morel as Pouillaud 
 Daniel Russo as André 
 Catherine Jacob as Lolotte André
 Guilaine Londez as Zig Thivart 
 Alexandra London as Géraldine Bergeade
 Eric Cantona as Lionel 
 Joël Cantona as Nono 
 Roger Gicquel as Charles
 Yolande Moreau as Lucette
 Serge Hazanavicius as Alexis Legoff
 Virginie Darmon as Puce Thivart 
 Christophe Kourotchkine as Rémi 
 Jean Bousquet as Father Léonard 
 Isabelle Nanty as A Worker
 Olivier Saladin as Car Showroom Customer

Awards
Eddy Mitchell received the 1996 César Award for Best Actor in a Supporting Role for his role in the film.

References

External links 
 
 

1995 films
French comedy films
1990s French-language films
Films featuring a Best Supporting Actor César Award-winning performance
Films directed by Étienne Chatiliez
1990s French films
1995 comedy films